Heinrich Schlitt (August 21, 1849 – November 13, 1923) was a German painter and illustrator, known for his fantasy motifs that feature gnomes, dwarves, and faeries. He was one of the in-house artists at the Villeroy & Boch ceramic company in Mettlach, Saarland, and his designs for their beer steins remain popular with collectors to this day.

Early life 
Schlitt was born in Wiesbaden in the Duchy of Nassau, what would now be in the modern day German state of Hesse. His father was a member of the court of the Duke of Nassau, working as a coachman. After the Prussian annexation of the Duchy, Schlitt joined the Dutch military, a choice thought to be the result of the Schlitt family moving to the Netherlands with the rest of the exiled Duchy.

Schlitt was a student of Kaspar Kögler at his school in Wiesbaden. In 1875, he continued his studies at the Academy of Fine Arts in Munich under Wilhelm Lindenschmit the Younger. He exhibited his works at exhibitions put on by the Munich Artists' Cooperative.

Works

Illustrator 
Early in his career, Schlitt first became well known to the public as an illustrator. He produced hundreds of illustrations for a wide array of publications, including books, periodicals, and newspapers such as Die Gartenlaube, Das Buch Für Alle, and Illustrirte Zeitung.

Ratskeller of the Munich New Town Hall 
In 1905, Schlitt was selected by architect Georg von Hauberrisser to paint the ceilings of the Ratskeller at the New Town Hall in Munich. The paintings were originally intended to adorn the walls of the St. Johann Town Hall ratskeller, but after disputes between the municipal administration of St. Johann and Schlitt regarding payment for the works, Schlitt withdrew from the project and instead used the concepts for the paintings in the Munich Ratskeller. The paintings are considered to be some of his finest works.

Villeroy & Boch 
Heinrich Schlitt was one of the principal in-house artists at Villeroy & Boch, a German ceramics manufacturer based in Mettlach. His work for the company is prominently featured on beer steins that they produced during the period, which are well known and held in renown amongst modern-day collectors of steins and ceramics.

References 

1849 births
1923 deaths
19th-century German painters
19th-century German male artists
People from Wiesbaden
Academy of Fine Arts, Munich alumni
20th-century German painters
20th-century German male artists